Albert Pendleton Strother (April 25, 1872 – January 26, 1946) was an American Republican politician who served as a member of the Virginia Senate. His elder brother was Congressman James F. Strother.

References

External links
 
 

1872 births
1946 deaths
Strother family
Republican Party Virginia state senators
20th-century American politicians